Azad Azadpour (born 24 November 1973), known professionally as Azad, is a German rapper of Kurdish descent based in Frankfurt. As one of the first German street rappers who become successful, he strongly influenced the German rap scene.

Career

After having arrived in Germany from Sanandaj in Iranian Kurdistan at the young age of 10, he was into hip hop, rap, beatboxing, and graffiti. In 1988, he joined D-Flame (Daniel Kretschmer), A-Bomb, and Combad in Cold-N-Locco. The group was renamed Asiatic Warriors in 1990 and mixed songs in German, English, Persian and Kurdish and achieved great fame through signing with Ruff'n'Raw Label and the EP Told Ya!. Internal differences between the band members resulted in the Asiatic Warriors breaking up.

In 1999, Azad signed as a solo artist with Pelham Power Productions. He became a sensation on the hip hop scene winning "Da Swing DJ Battle". The single "Napalm" followed by his self-produced solo album Leben and the follow-up album Faust des Nordwestens firmly established him as a successful artist and a cult figure.

In 2004, Azad founded his own production company "Bozz Music", the urban music wing of Universal Music. He formed the group Warheit together with Sezai, Lunafrow, Jeyz, and Chaker. Soon, a rivalry erupted between Azad and Bozz Music label on the one side and Aggro Berlin label on the other. This put Azad even more in the spotlight as the rivalry escalated.

Azad released his third studio album Der Bozz in 2004, reaching the German Albums Top 10 and outselling his first two albums by far. However, the Federal Department for Media Harmful to Young Persons slammed the album as too violent and a "danger to youth".

Oddly enough, Azad's biggest commercial success was a joint effort with German rapper Kool Savas in One, released via BMG and hitting the top 5 on the German Albums Chart. Game Over, his fourth album, reached number 8. He has released further albums but with relative success (Blockschrift in 2007, Azphalt Inferno, and Assassin both in 2009)

He is also known for his collaborations with various artists like Belarusian rapper Seryoga.

Azad's German number 1 hit single is "Prison Break Anthem (Ich glaub' an dich)", featuring Adel Tawil of Ich + Ich. It is a German-language theme song for the popular American television series Prison Break broadcast with German voiceover on RTL.

The follow up to his debut Leben, Leben II, was released on 15 January 2016.

Discography

Albums

Singles

References

1974 births
People from Sanandaj
Living people
German rappers
German people of Kurdish descent
Iranian Kurdish people
Iranian emigrants to Germany
Musicians from Frankfurt